John Timothy Curzon (born 4 June 1954 in Lenton, Nottingham) is an English former first-class cricketer active 1978 who played for Nottinghamshire.

References

External links

1954 births
English cricketers
Nottinghamshire cricketers
Living people
People from Lenton, Nottingham
Cricketers from Nottinghamshire
20th-century English people